Reggie Craig is a former professional American football player who played wide receiver for four seasons for the Kansas City Chiefs, Cleveland Browns, and Buffalo Bills.

References

1953 births
American football wide receivers
Kansas City Chiefs players
Cleveland Browns players
Buffalo Bills players
Arkansas Razorbacks football players
Living people